The Ford Consul is a car that was manufactured by Ford of Britain from 1951 until 1962. The name was later revived for a model produced by Ford in both the UK and in Germany from 1972 until 1975.

Between 1951 and 1962, the Consul was the four-cylinder base model of the three-model Ford Zephyr range, comprising Consul, Zephyr, and Zephyr Zodiac. In 1956, the line was restyled. In 1962, the Consul was replaced by the Zephyr 4, the mid-range Zephyr model becoming the Zephyr 6, and the top-of-the-range Zephyr Zodiac just being called the Zodiac. At this point, Consul became a range of smaller cars in its own right, initially the Consul Classic and Consul Capri, shortly joined by the even smaller Consul Cortina. The Consul Classic was only made for two years (August 1961 - March 1963), before being replaced by the Consul Corsair. The Consul Capri was made from October 1961 until August 1964.

The Consul Classic, the Consul Capri, and the Consul Corsair (made from 1963 until 1970) were relatively short-lived, but the Ford Cortina, after losing (along with the Corsair) the "Consul" tag in 1964, went on to become a best-seller. The Consul name was again used by Ford from 1972 to 1975 on a replacement for the Zephyr range, now sharing a body with the more luxurious Ford Granada Mark I. The two-door coupé Capri's name was also reintroduced in 1969, and survived until 1986.

Ford Consul EOTA (1951–1956)

The 1500 cc four-cylinder Consul was first shown at the 1950 London Motor Show. It was the start of Ford of Britain's successful attack on the family saloon car market. With stablemate Zephyr, it was the first British Ford with modern unibody construction. The Zephyr Six replaced the larger-engined V-8 Pilot which had been made in only small numbers. The Consul  was given the Ford code of EOTA. Most cars were four-door saloons with body design by George Walker of the parent United States Ford Motor Company, but a few estate cars were made by the coachbuilder Abbott. From 1953, a convertible conversion by Carbodies became available. Having lost most of its strength with its roof, the unibody was reinforced by welding in a large X-frame to the floor pan. Unlike the more expensive Zephyr, the hood (convertible top) had to be put up and down manually.

It was also the first car they built with up-to-date technology. The new 1508 cc   engine had overhead valves, and hydraulic clutch operation was used, which in 1950 was an unusual feature.   However, a three-speed gearbox, with synchromesh only on second and top, was retained. The Consul was also the first British production car to use the now-common MacPherson strut independent front suspension.

The bench front seat was trimmed in PVC, and the handbrake was operated by an umbrella-style  pull lever under the facia (dash). The windscreen wipers used the antiquated vacuum system, but it came from a vacuum pump linked to the camshaft-driven fuel pump instead of the induction manifold as on Ford's earlier applications of this arrangement. Clearly keen to keep things positive, a 1950 road test by the British Autocar magazine reported that the wipers were "free from the disadvantage of early suction-driven wipers that dried up at wide throttle opening   ... and spare[d] the battery".   The initial dashboard was a flat, symmetrical panel with interchangeable instrument cluster and glovebox, but from September 1952, a redesigned asymmetrical dashboard was fitted, and the instruments, consisting of speedometer, ammeter, and fuel gauge, were positioned in a housing above the steering column, with a full-width parcel shelf on which an optional radio could be placed.

The test car cost £732 including taxes.

Ford Consul Mark II (1956–1962)

In 1956, a new Consul appeared with the Ford code of 204E. The car was still the four-cylinder submodel of the Zephyr range, with which it shared the same basic body shell. Compared with the original, it had a longer wheelbase, larger 1703 cc,  engine, and a complete restyle, borrowing cues from the 1956 models of America's Thunderbird and Fairlane. One thing not updated was the windscreen wipers, which were still vacuum-operated. The roof profile was lowered in 1959 on the Mark II 'lowline' version, which also had redesigned rear lights and much of the external bright work in stainless steel.  Front disc brakes with vacuum servo appeared as an option in 1960 and were made standard in 1961 (four-wheel drum brakes only, in Australia). The name became the Consul 375 in mid-1961.

The convertible version made by Carbodies continued. A De Luxe version with contrasting roof colour and higher equipment specification was added in 1957. The Australian market had factory-built versions of the coupé utility (pick up) and estate car (station wagon), as well as a locally engineered version of the saloon. They were also imported by Ford of Canada as a companion to the Falcon.

The test car cost £781 including taxes. A 1960 Ford Consul Mark II was the taxi in which American singer Eddie Cochran died, and not, as many have stated, a London hackney cab.

Ford Consul (Granada Mark I based) (1972–1975) 

The Ford Consul name was revived in April 1972 for the lower-priced, lower-specification variants of the newly introduced Ford Granada. Developed jointly by Ford Britain and Ford of Germany, the cars were built in Cologne in West Germany and in Dagenham in the United Kingdom. Consul models can be identified by a two-panel cross-mesh grille as opposed to the horizontal chrome bar grille of the Granadas.

Consul, Consul L, and Consul GT models were offered and were available in two-door saloon, four-door saloon, two-door coupé, and five-door estate bodystyles. Unlike the previous Zephyr Estate, the Consul Estate was produced by Ford rather than by an outside contractor.

In addition, the Consul GT was powered by the 2994 cc Essex V6 engine providing . Because it was less well equipped than the similarly powered Granada, it was about  lighter and correspondingly quicker. In late 1974, the Essex V4 was replaced by the 2.0 litre Pinto engine.

In Germany, the Consul was offered with a choice of German-built Ford engines, starting with the 1699 cc Ford Taunus V4 engine familiar to drivers of the Ford Taunus 17M. The 2.0 litre straight-four and a 2.3 litre  Cologne V6 were also available.

The Consul name was discontinued in late 1975 after the UK Court of Appeal ruled that Granada Group could not prevent Ford registering the name Granada as a trademark. The Granada name was then applied to all models.

See also
 Ford Consul Capri for the Ford Consul Capri
 Ford Consul Classic for the Ford Consul Classic
 Ford Corsair for the Ford Consul Corsair
 Ford Cortina for the Ford Consul Cortina

References

Further reading
A-Z of cars 1945–1970. Sedgwick and Gillies. Bayview books. 1986. .
Ford Consul, Zephyr and Zodiac. Graham Robson. Crowood Press. 2007.

External links
The Ford Mk1 Consul, Zephyr and Zodiac Owners Club

Consul
Cars introduced in 1951
Sedans
Rear-wheel-drive vehicles